Horatio Nelson, 1st Viscount Nelson was a British Admiral.

Horatio Nelson may also refer to:

Horatio Nelson, 3rd Earl Nelson (1823–1913), 1st Viscount's nephew
Horatio Admiral Nelson (1838–1905), American-born merchant, manufacturer and political figure in Quebec
Horatio Nelson (horse) (2003–2006), racehorse

See also

Nelson, Horatio